Schlemmin TV Tower is a TV tower of reinforced concrete southwest of Schlemmin, a village in the municipality of Bernitt in northern Germany. The tower was built in 1967. It quickly became a well-known tourist attraction, and so in 1969 an inn was also built at its foot.
It was closed to the public after these modernization measures; the inn was also demolished.

See also
 List of towers

External links 

 https://www.buetzow-schwaan.de/schlemmin.htm 
 http://skyscraperpage.com/diagrams/?b62965
 

Towers completed in 1967
Observation towers in Mecklenburg-Western Pomerania
Communication towers in Germany
1967 establishments in East Germany